John Quincy Jordan (died March 5, 1978) was an African-American journalist who covered all-black marine units in Italy during World War II. While there, he filed dispatches as a correspondent for the black-oriented Norfolk Journal and Guide. He also aided the evacuation of injured units and prepared black soldiers for interviews with white journalists.

Legacy
Norfolk State University now awards the John Q. Jordan scholarship to undergraduate journalism students.

References

 Terry, Wallace. Missing Pages: Black Journalists of Modern America: An Oral History (2007) Carroll & Graf

American male journalists
African-American journalists
Year of birth missing

1978 deaths